Reviews of Geophysics is a quarterly peer-reviewed scientific journal published by Wiley-Blackwell on behalf of the American Geophysical Union. The current editor-in-chief is Fabio Florindo  (National Institute of Geophysics and Volcanology–Rome).

History 
Reviews of Geophysics was established in 1963. Between February 1970 and November 1984 it was named Reviews of Geophysics and Space Physics. Throughout the years its frequency varied. It was quarterly in 1970–74, five per year in 1975, quarterly again in 1976–78, eight issues in 1979, quarterly in 1980–82, and finally eight issues in 1983, before being renamed to Reviews of Geophysics in 1984.

Aims and scope 
As a review publication by invitation only, Reviews of Geophysics provides an overview of geophysics research. It integrates summations of previous scientific investigations with active research areas. Critical analysis of the progress in, and direction of, geophysics is provided. Topical coverage includes solid-earth geophysics, cryospheric science, oceans and atmospheric studies, meteorology, and oceanography), along with the physics of the solar system and its processes. For example, coverage includes processes that tend to concern the public such as rainfall rates, trends in marine fisheries, earthquake probabilities, and volcanic eruption potentials.

Notable articles 
The three most highly cited articles published in Reviews of Geophysics are:

Mellor, G. L.; Yamada, T. (1982). "Development of a turbulence closure-model for geophysical fluid problems". Reviews of Geophysics. 20 (4): 851–875. Bibcode:1982RvGSP..20..851M. doi:10.1029/RG020i004p00851.

Farr, Tom G.; Rosen, Paul A.; Caro, Edward; et al. (2007). "The shuttle radar topography mission".  Reviews of Geophysics. https://doi.org/10.1029/2005RG000183.

Stuart Ross Taylor and Scott M. McLennan (1995). "The geochemical evolution of the continental crust". Reviews of Geophysics. https://doi.org/10.1029/95RG00262.

Abstracting and indexing 
The journal is abstracted and indexed in:

According to the Journal Citation Reports, the journal has a 2020 impact factor of 22.000.

See also 
 List of scientific journals in earth and atmospheric sciences
 List of scientific journals in physics

References

External links 
 

Geophysics journals
English-language journals
Publications established in 1963
American Geophysical Union academic journals
Wiley-Blackwell academic journals